The 2011–12 EWHL Super Cup was the first edition of the EWHL Super Cup, a women's ice hockey tournament organized by the Elite Women's Hockey League (EWHL).

The top two teams from the previous season in the Elite Women's Hockey League, the German women's ice hockey Bundesliga, and the Switzerland women's ice hockey league were eligible to participate in the EWHL Super Cup. The HC Lugano Ladies, the second place team in the Swiss league, declined to participate in the tournament

Tournament

Results

1The game was originally scheduled for November 20, 2011, but was cancelled due to the failure of the ice machine.

Final table

External links
Elite Women's Hockey League official website

2011–12 in women's ice hockey
EWHL Super Cup